was considered to be one of Japan's most powerful and influential building tycoons. He joined the real estate business of his father, Taikichiro Mori, after graduating from Tokyo University and was president and CEO of Mori Building, of which he and his older brother Kei's (a  university professor) families owned 100%. He owned 12.74% of Sunwood Corporation.

The family name is found on many real estate developments in Japan. Minoru and his brother Akira were listed on the Forbes list of the world's richest men. His largest project was the Roppongi Hills development in Tokyo, which opened in 2003. The Shanghai World Financial Center, once China's tallest building, was completed in 2008. Mori acknowledged the influence of Le Corbusier but believed he had surpassed the Swiss architect's urban designs, particularly in the Roppongi Hills project.

In 2006, Mori's last development, Omotesando Hills, opened near Harajuku station consisting of a set of ramped shopping floors.

In 2008, he was named Asia Businessman of the Year 2007 by Fortune magazine.

In 2009, he was honored as an honorary Knight Commander of the Order of the British Empire (KBE) by Queen Elizabeth II. He died of heart failure in 2012.  He was 77.

Noteworthy developments 
 Shanghai World Financial Center
 Roppongi Hills
 Mori Tower
 Ark Hills
 Atago Green Hills
 Holland Hills
 Omotesando Hills
 Roppongi First Building

Residential
 Akasaka Tameike Tower
 Ark Towers
Wangdu Towers
 Ark Forest Terrace
 Roppongi First Plaza
 Nishi-Azabu Forest Plaza
 Moto-Azabu Hills

See also 
 Akira Mori
 Mori Art Museum

References 

1934 births
2012 deaths
University of Tokyo alumni
Japanese chief executives
Japanese businesspeople in real estate
Museum founders
Honorary Knights Commander of the Order of the British Empire
Mori Building
20th-century philanthropists